Transcience is a studio album by English musician Wreckless Eric. It was released on 17 May 2019 through Southern Domestic.

Critical reception
Transience was met with universal acclaim reviews from critics. At Metacritic, which assigns a weighted average rating out of 100 to reviews from mainstream publications, this release received an average score of 83, based on 5 reviews.

Track listing

References

2019 albums
Wreckless Eric albums